The 1977 Cornell Big Red football team was an American football team that represented Cornell University during the 1977 NCAA Division I football season. Cornell tied for last in the Ivy League. 

In its first season under head coach Bob Blackman, the team compiled a 1–8 record and was outscored 199 to 86. Tony Anzalone and Terry Lee were the team captains. 

Cornell's 1–6 conference record tied for seventh place in the Ivy League standings. The Big Red were outscored 107 to 50 by Ivy opponents. 

Cornell played its home games at Schoellkopf Field in Ithaca, New York.

Schedule

References

Cornell
Cornell Big Red football seasons
Cornell Big Red football